Shrikant is a male Indian given name.

People with the name
Shrikant Bhasi (born 1968), Indian businessman
Shrikant Jadhav (born 1960), Indian cricketer
Shrikant Jichkar (1954–2004), Indian politician
Shrikant Joshi (born 1958), Indian businessman
Shrikant Kalyani (born 1964), Indian cricketer
Shrikant Lele (born 1943), Indian engineer
Shrikant Mundhe (born 1988), Indian cricketer
Shrikant Narayan (born 1968), Indian singer
Shrikant Shah (born 1936), Indian poet and novelist
Shrikant Sharma, Indian politician
Shrikant Shinde (born 1987), Indian politician
Shrikant Verma (1931–1986), Indian poet and politician
Shrikant Wagh (born 1988), Indian cricketer
Shrikant Yadav, Indian cricketer
Shrikant Thokchom (born 2002), Artist and Politician

See also
Srikanta (disambiguation)